Malta participated in the Junior Eurovision Song Contest 2019 held in Gliwice, Poland. Their entrant was selected through a national selection, organised by the Maltese broadcaster Public Broadcasting Services (PBS) on 20 August 2019.

Background

Prior to the 2019 Contest, Malta had participated in the Junior Eurovision Song Contest fourteen times since its first entry in 2003 only opting not to participate at the 2011 and 2012 contests. Malta has won on two occasions: in 2013 when Gaia Cauchi won with the song "The Start", and again in 2015 when Destiny Chukunyere came first with "Not My Soul" when it won the contest with 185 points, breaking the previous record held by Spain for the most points ever given to a winner. In the 2018 contest, Ela Mangion represented her country in Minsk, Belarus with the song "Marchin' On". She ended 5th out of 20 entries with 181 points.

Before Junior Eurovision

Malta Junior Eurovision Song Contest 2019
The winner was determined by a combination of jury voting and public televoting. For the public vote, voting commenced on 3 August 2019 and closed on 13 August 2019, and the winner was announced on 20 August 2019. The jury consisted of Claudia Faniello (singer, represented Malta in the Eurovision Song Contest 2017), Ela Mangion (singer, represented Malta in the Junior Eurovision Song Contest 2018) and Deo Grech (head of INFE Malta).

Artist and song information

Eliana Gomez Blanco
Eliana Gomez Blanco (born 3 January 2005) is a Maltese singer. She represented Malta at the Junior Eurovision Song Contest 2019 with the song "We Are More". On November 21, 2022, Malta announced the 40 artists of MESC 2023. Eliana Gomez Blanco was on the list with the song "Guess What". She received 20 points, placing eighth out of the 16 acts in the final.

We Are More
"We Are More" is a song by Maltese singer Eliana Gomez Blanco. It represented Malta at the Junior Eurovision Song Contest 2019.

At Junior Eurovision
During the opening ceremony and the running order draw which both took place on 18 November 2019, Malta was drawn to perform eighth on 24 November 2019, following Belarus and preceding Wales.

Voting

Detailed voting results

References

Junior Eurovision Song Contest
Malta
2019